The 51st Dan Kolov & Nikola Petrov Tournament,  was a sport wrestling event held in  Plovdiv, Bulgaria between 15 and 17 February 2013.

This international tournament includes competition in both men's and women's freestyle wrestling and men's Greco-Roman wrestling. This tournament is held in honor of Dan Kolov who was the first European freestyle wrestling champion from Bulgaria and  European and World Champion Nikola Petroff.

Medal table

Medal overview

Men's freestyle

Greco-Roman

Women's freestyle

Participating nations

References 

2013 in European sport
2013 in sport wrestling
February 2013 sports events in Europe
2013 in Bulgarian sport